Ketu South is one of the constituencies represented in the Parliament of Ghana. It elects one Member of Parliament (MP) by the first past the post system of election. Ketu South is located in the Ketu district of the Volta Region of Ghana.

Boundaries
The constituency is located within the Ketu South Municipal of the Volta Region of Ghana. Its North Eastern border is shared with the Republic of Togo. Ketu North constituency is located to the North West. To the South East is the Atlantic ocean. The South Western neighbour of this constituency is the Keta District.

Members of Parliament

Elections

 
 
 
 

 
 
 87534

See also
List of Ghana Parliament constituencies

References 

Parliamentary constituencies in the Volta Region